Yangqu County is a county of Shanxi Province, North China, it is under the administration of the prefecture-level city of Taiyuan, the capital of the province, and is both its northernmost and easternmost county-level division.

History

In 1920, Peter Torjesen, a Norwegian missionary, went to Hequ in Shanxi Province and established various social and community services as part of his ministry. In 1989 the Shanxi provincial government invited Torjesen's descendants, who had since emigrated to the United States, to return to Shanxi and resume this charitable work. In response, the Torjesen family and their friends established Shanxi Evergreen Services. (‘Evergreen’ is a reference to the Chinese name that Torjesen used). The organisation has since grown steadily.

Work has included long-term training programmes for local health professionals in family medicine and maternal and child health. A ‘Samaritan Fund’ covers the costs of essential medical treatment for impoverished people in Yangqu County.

SES provides scholarships for children from poor families to remain in school, and has established a community centre that includes a library and computer equipment. Various activities for local children take place at the centre, which also oversees a mobile library service that lends reading materials to rural schools.

An Evergreen Agricultural Training and Demonstration Centre facilitates training in appropriate agricultural technologies, provides assistance in marketing produce, and helps farmers to form cooperatives and technical associations that improve productivity. New, low-cost biogas digester technology is now being tested, for incorporation into agricultural development projects.

Other ongoing projects include English language training for people with limited access to foreign teachers – such as health workers in urban hospitals, rural middle school teachers; assistance to Chinese and international businesses and organizations looking to bring foreign investment to Shanxi, and facilitation of foreign experts and cultural exchanges in military, publishing, academic, religious and economic sectors.

Climate

References

External links
www.xzqh.org 

County-level divisions of Shanxi